Konstantin Vladimirovich Selyavin (born 8 April 1974) is a former Russian professional football player.

Club career
He played two seasons in the Russian Football National League for FC Torpedo Ryazan.

References

1974 births
Sportspeople from Ryazan
Living people
Soviet footballers
Russian footballers
Association football defenders
FC Lukhovitsy players
FC Spartak Ryazan players